Sgt. Frog, known in Japan as , is a Japanese manga series written and illustrated by Mine Yoshizaki. It was launched in Monthly Shōnen Ace in April 1999. The story follows the attempts of a platoon of frog-like alien invaders to conquer Earth. Sergeant Keroro, the titular character, is the leader of the platoon, but is at the mercy of a human family of three after being captured by them. Keroro is forced to do meaningless chores and errands for the family after his army abandons his platoon on Earth.

The series was later adapted into an anime television series by Sunrise, which ran for 358 episodes from April 2004 to April 2011. A second 23-episode series was broadcast from March to September 2014. In 2005, the manga received the 50th Shogakukan Manga Award for the children's manga category.

Plot

The Keroro Platoon is a group of five, froglike alien soldiers from Planet Keron. They mean to conquer “Pekopon” (their name for  "Earth") but fail every time they try.  Their leader, Sergeant Keroro, is incompetent and has little interest in conquering Pekopon. Instead, he likes making plastic Gundam models, watching TV, or coming up with schemes to make money. The four other members of the platoon are adorable but violent Private Second Class Tamama; bellicose yet tenderhearted Corporal Giroro; intelligent but mischievous Sergeant Major Kururu; and disciplined but traumatized Lance Corporal Dororo.

The largest obstacle in the way of their mission is the Hinata Family, who must take care of the Keroro Platoon due to the Keron Army deserting the latter on Earth. Keroro is kept busy with manual labor and constant abuse, primarily from the family daughter, Natsumi. Each member of the platoon finds himself in the care of a human: Giroro's is Natsumi Hinata, whom he falls in love with; Keroro's is Fuyuki Hinata, who considers the sergeant his only true friend; Kururu's is Mutsumi Saburo, who's just as mischievous as him; Dororo's is Koyuki Azumaya, a fellow ninja; and Tamama's is Momoka Nishizawa, who's just as bipolar as him. All are tied to the Hinatas in some way throughout the events in the anime and manga.

Media

Manga

Sgt. Frog is published in Japan by Kadokawa Shoten, serialized in the magazine Monthly Shōnen Ace, and was published in English by Tokyopop. The manga, first aimed at the older audience (teens/adults) from the first to the seventh volume, was toned down after the anime adaption started (since the TV series was a family show). However, the manga still maintains suggestive comedy that only the more mature audiences understand in present volumes. Tokyopop initially held the American rights to the Sgt. Frog manga until 2011 when the company ceased operations. By the time their publication ended, they had published 21 volumes. Their release of the manga have censored nipples drawn in some scenes, in order to get away from the OT (Older teen) rating and maintaining its Teen rating. Viz Media relicensed the manga for digital release on December 16, 2014.

To commemorate the 20th anniversary of the series, the November issue of Shōnen Ace announced the launching of a new manga titled Chō Keroro Gunsō UC: Keroro Robo Daikessen (Super Sgt. Frog Ultra Cool: Keroro Robo's Epic Climactic Battle) on the next issue, on sale October 26, 2018. The manga is created by Yūtarō Shido, while Mine Yoshikizaki being credited as original author.

Anime

The anime series started airing on TV Tokyo in 2004 and ended in 2011. The anime is produced by Sunrise, NAS, and TV Tokyo and has also been aired on Animax, Cartoon Network Japan, and TXN. Seven seasons have been created during its seven-year run. Unlike the manga which is aimed at older audiences, the anime adaptation has been toned down to a level suitable for family audiences.

The anime ran almost year-round, with each season beginning in the first week of April and ending on the last week of March. The first season aired on Saturdays, but the show was moved to Fridays for the second and third seasons. The show returned to Saturdays for seasons four, five and six, and the final season aired on Sundays.

The first English-language dub of the show to be released was entitled Sergeant Keroro and aired on Animax Asia, a pay TV channel received in multiple countries in Southeast Asia, including Indonesia, Malaysia, the Philippines, Singapore, and Thailand. It premiered in 2008.

In the United States, ADV had previously announced they had acquired exclusive rights to an English dub of Sgt. Frog (for $408,000). However, on July 4, 2008, it was announced that rights to the English release were transferred to Funimation Entertainment.

ADV Films had originally added a brief teaser page to their website, announcing their licensing of the anime. The site turned to static before playing a short clip of Keroro dancing to "Afro Gunso," then leaving the message "hacked by the frog." This was followed by a press release from ADV on November 20, 2006, stating that they had licensed all Sgt. Frog properties (except the manga, which was already licensed by Tokyopop) for the US. It was once confirmed that the anime dub would be released on DVD in the United States in February 2007. However, ADV Films had never confirmed a release date. ADV announced at Comic-Con International 2007 that the US release date had been delayed because of TV negotiations but would not comment on which networks they were talking to. In a DVD included with the December issue of Newtype USA was an English-language trailer for Sgt. Frog released by ADV, with voices for Keroro (said to be voiced by Vic Mignogna), Natsumi, Fuyuki, Aki, and the narrator. ADV was 90% done on getting a deal with the show, though they created a separate team to work specifically on it that included people from Summit Entertainment (the company that worked with 4Kids Entertainment during the time they had Pokémon). They had dubbed three episodes, but they were dubbed three times because ADV created three different pilot-packages for television to see which one worked the best. They made an otaku/fan pilot, a mass-market pilot, and a kids' pilot. They received positive responses from three different networks. Cartoon Network liked the mass-market pilot, while Nickelodeon liked the kids' pilot. Nickelodeon told them that they would air the show if ADV got the merchandising rights. However, as of July 4, 2008, the English license for the first 51 episodes of the Sgt. Frog anime was transferred to Funimation Entertainment through a deal with Sojitz.

Funimation released a dubbed version of episode 12B as a test on YouTube to be reviewed by the viewers. Many instances of regional name changes were observed; Natsumi is renamed Natalie, and Giroro's cat was renamed "Mr. Furbottom," (despite being female). Additionally, the word Pekopon was changed to Planet Wuss, Pekoponians were referred to as Wussians (Both were done because the terms "Pekopon", and "Pekoponjin" are both derogatory words the Japanese historically used to describe China and its peoples during the Sino-Japanese Wars, and has since been censored from TV programs by the mass communications authority in Japan.), Keron was changed to Frogulon and Keronians were called Frogulonians respectively. The extra-terrestrial frogs' names remained the same as the Japanese version, though shortened by one syllable (e.g. Keroro changed to Kero, Tamama to Tama). The test episode had mixed reviews by fans involving the voice acting, jokes, and name changes.

At Otakon 2009, the first five episodes of Sgt. Frog were screened, where the original versions of the various names that were changed were used. The voice actor for Sergeant Keroro in the test video, Chris Cason, was swapped out for Sergeant Major Kululu's test actor, Todd Haberkorn. Kululu was changed to Chuck Huber, and the narrator also appears to have been changed. FUNimation stated at their panel that they were going to keep the anime as similar as possible to its Japanese counterpart, and claimed to only change references from Japanese pop culture (save for those Americans were already familiar with) to references from American pop culture. Those present at the showing seemed to enjoy the changes, and the reception of the official dub was very positive. On February 19, 2011, Funimation announced at Katsucon that they had licensed more episodes of Sgt. Frog.

According to Funimation, as of February 2013, the English dub of Sgt. Frog is "now on hiatus".

On July 31, 2009, Funimation added the first 4 dubbed episodes of the series to their online video portal. After a considerable delay following between the release of the first dubbed episodes, Funimation began making dubbed episodes other than the first 4 available on the portal. Currently, the first 51 subtitled episodes are available on the Funimation video portal and Hulu. The 51 dubbed episodes later expired, although they were all later placed back on the portal and on Hulu. The show is rated TV-PG on the DVDs and on Hulu. Unlike the other versions released outside Japan, the US version remains uncut.

The episode distribution scheme has been slightly changed from the Japanese Region 2 release. Although the first 51 episodes are known as "Season 1" in Japan, Funimation has divided the episodes into a "Season 1" and a "Season 2". The Season 1 Part 1 DVD set was released September 22, 2009. It contains episodes 1 through 13, Season 1 Part 2 was released on November 24, 2009, and contains episodes 14 through 26. Season 2 Part 1 was released on January 26, 2010, containing episodes 27–39. In addition, Season 2 Part 2 was released on March 30, 2010, containing episodes 40–51. The first two boxsets were re-released into one Season 1 set on March 29, 2011. The complete Season 2 set followed up on April 26, 2011. Season 3 Part 1 was released to DVD by Funimation beginning on July 26, 2011, containing episodes 52–65. Season 3 Part 2 was released to DVD on August 16, 2011, containing episodes 66–78. A complete Season 3 boxset containing episodes 52-78 was released on November 13, 2012. On all of the box sets, it states, "from the creators of the Gundam series". This is relatively incorrect because Sunrise did not create the Gundam series, they produced it, so it should say "from the studio that brought you Gundam". The creator of Gundam is Yoshiyuki Tomino. After the Funimation home video sets went out of print, Discotek Media re-licensed the home video rights.

All three seasons were available on Netflix streaming as of December 2011; however, the first two seasons, and the first half of the third, were removed without warning in January 2013, before the series was completely removed in April of the same year.

On January 7, 2014, it was announced that a new Flash anime television series entitled "Keroro" would premiere on Animax on March 22 of that year. Haruki Kasugamori is the director of the series at Sunrise and the animation studio Gathering is providing assistance with the animation. The series airs during the programming block, Keroro Hour, which airs both the series and reruns of Sgt. Frog. The series features new character designs and includes the characters, New Keroro, Tomosu Hinohara, and Myō Kaneami, all of which were originally manga-only characters. The opening to the series is "Keroro☆Popstar" (ケロロ☆ポップスター), performed by Mayumi Gojo. The flash anime ended on September 6 of the same year, with a total of 23 episodes.

Films

Five full-length theatrical movies that were directed by Junichi Sato and produced by Sunrise were released:

  (2006)
  (2007)
  (2008)
  (2009)
  (2010)

Planetarium

An exclusive feature only available for limited time at specific Planetariums was released after the end of the show.

  (2014)

Spin-offs and guest appearances

 Spin-offs include a manga called Musha Kero that has recently been adapted in the anime. The series has spawned a magazine called Keroro Land that promotes toys, games, media, and events based on the manga and anime.
 Sgt. Keroro, Tamama, Giroro, Dororo and Kululu make cameo appearances in the 1st movie of Kaiketsu Zorori. 
 Keroro and Tamama have appearances in the OVA of Lucky Star, and Kagami spends almost all her money on a grip-claw game trying to get a Keroro doll. 
 Japanese action RPG game Monster Hunter Tri G has downloadable costumes of Keroro for the humanoid companions Kayamba and Cha-Cha.
 Keroro, Giroro, Tamama, Kururu and Dororo appeared as playable characters in the Nexon mobile game Kemono Friends. The characters were added during a collaboration event. Like the animal characters in the game, the Keronians take the form of human girls. Enemy monsters called "Ceruleans" also appear, taking the forms of Natsumi and Keroro herself. Mine Yoshizaki, the creator of Sgt. Frog, is also the concept designer of the Kemono Friends franchise.

Video games
Many of the video games were only released in Japan, but there were others released in Korea.

Reception
In 2005, the manga received the 50th Shogakukan Manga Award for children's manga.

Notes

References

External links
 Keroro Gunsō website 
 Sunrise's Keroro Gunsō website 
 TV Tokyo Keroro Gunsō website  
 Official Keroro Gunsō Movie Website 
 Keroro Gunsō episode guide
 Sgt. Frog's Official English Website
 

 
1999 manga
2004 anime television series debuts
Japanese children's animated comic science fiction television series
Alien invasions in comics
Alien invasions in fiction
Bandai Namco franchises
Comedy anime and manga
Discotek Media
Extraterrestrials in anime and manga
Funimation
Kadokawa Shoten manga
Kadokawa Dwango franchises
Manga adapted into films
School life in anime and manga
Science fiction anime and manga
Shōnen manga
Sunrise (company)
Tokyopop titles
TVB
TV Tokyo original programming
Winners of the Shogakukan Manga Award for children's manga
Mass media franchises
Viz Media manga
Video games developed in Japan
PlayStation 2 games
Nintendo DS games